Local elections were held in Taiwan on 1 December 2001 to elect magistrates of counties and mayors of cities, on 26 January 2002 to elect councillors in county/city councils and mayors of townships and cities, on 8 June 2002 to elect representatives in township/city councils and village chiefs (all except in Taipei City), and on 7 December 2002 to elect mayors and councillors of special municipalities.

Magistrate/mayor elections in counties/cities

Mayor elections in special municipalities 
The election was administered directly under the central government of Taiwan. Mayor candidates for the Kuomintang were elected in Taipei, while candidates for the Democratic Progressive Party were elected in Kaohsiung.

Taipei City

Kaohsiung City

See also 
 Elections in Taiwan

Notes

References 

2001 elections in Taiwan
December 2001 events in Asia
2001